Kántorjánosi is a village in Szabolcs-Szatmár-Bereg county, in the Northern Great Plain region of eastern Hungary.

Before World War II, there was a Jewish community. Most of the Jews were murdered by the Nazis in the Holocaust.

Geography

References

Populated places in Szabolcs-Szatmár-Bereg County